Agathis lenticula is a tree of Borneo in the conifer family Araucariaceae. The specific epithet  is from the Latin meaning "like a double-convex lens", referring to the leaf shape.

Description
Its bark is greyish brown. The male cones are cylindrical in shape, the female ones spherical.

Distribution and habitat
Agathis lenticula is endemic to Borneo.

References

lenticula
Trees of Borneo
Endemic flora of Borneo
Plants described in 1979
Taxonomy articles created by Polbot
Taxa named by David John de Laubenfels
Flora of the Borneo montane rain forests